Market Street Mansion District is a national historic district located at Wilmington, New Hanover County, North Carolina. The district encompasses four large impressive early-20th century dwellings set on large lots.  They are the Georgian Revival style Bridgers-Emerson-Kenan Mansion (1907-1908), the Classical Revival style Holt-Wise Mansion (1908), Classical Revival style Bridgers-Brooks Mansion (1909-1911), and the Georgian Revival style Bluethenhal House (1917).

It was listed on the National Register of Historic Places in 1975.

References

Houses on the National Register of Historic Places in North Carolina
Historic districts on the National Register of Historic Places in North Carolina
Georgian Revival architecture in North Carolina
Neoclassical architecture in North Carolina
Buildings and structures in Wilmington, North Carolina
National Register of Historic Places in New Hanover County, North Carolina
Houses in New Hanover County, North Carolina